Skrastiņš (feminine: Skrastiņa) is a Latvian topographic surname, derived from the Latvian dialect word for "coast" (skrasts). Individuals with the surname include:
 Artūrs Skrastiņš (born 1974), Latvian actor
 Kārlis Skrastiņš (1974–2011), Latvian ice hockey player

 Keith Skrastiņš (born 1982), Canadian Photographer of Latvian Decent

See also 
Krastiņš

Latvian toponymic surnames
Latvian-language masculine surnames